Icon Comics is an imprint of Marvel Comics for creator-owned titles, designed to keep select "A-list" creators producing for Marvel rather than seeing them take creator-owned work to other publishers.

History
It was launched in 2004 with Michael Avon Oeming and Brian Michael Bendis' superhero/detective series Powers and David Mack's Kabuki moving to the imprint, both from Image Comics. In June 2005 the imprint's third title J. Michael Straczynski's Dream Police was launched, followed in September by The Book of Lost Souls, also from Straczynski. Criminal by Ed Brubaker and Sean Phillips is an ongoing crime comic also published by Icon.

Mark Millar has described the deal with Icon in relation to his Kick-Ass series:

Titles
Following the move of Brian Michael Bendis (as well as all of his comics) to DC Comics in 2017, the Icon imprint has been dormant:
 Brilliant by writer Brian Michael Bendis and artist Mark Bagley
 Casanova by writer Matt Fraction and artists Gabriel Bá and Fábio Moon, moved back to Image Comics in 2014
 Criminal by writer Ed Brubaker and artist Sean Phillips, moved to Image Comics in 2016
 Dream Logic, by writer-artist David Mack
 Dream Police by writer J. Michael Straczynski and artist Sid Kotian, moved to Image Comics in 2014
 Empress by writer Mark Millar and artist Stuart Immonen
 Hit-Girl by writer Mark Millar and artist John Romita Jr., moved to Image Comics in 2018
 Incognito by writer Ed Brubaker and artist Sean Phillips
 Jack Kirby's Galactic Bounty Hunters
 Kabuki by writer-artist David Mack, moved to Dark Horse Comics in 2014
 Kick-Ass by writer Mark Millar and artist John Romita Jr., moved to Image Comics in 2018
 Kick-Ass 2 by writer Mark Millar and artist John Romita Jr., moved to Image Comics in 2018
 Kick-Ass 3 by writer Mark Millar and artist John Romita Jr., moved to Image Comics in 2018
 Men of Wrath by writer Jason Aaron and artist Ron Garney
 Nemesis by writer Mark Millar and artist Steve McNiven
 Painkiller Jane by writer Jimmy Palmiotti and artist Joe Quesada
 Powers by writer Brian Michael Bendis and artist Michael Avon Oeming, moved to Jinxworld in 2018
 Scarlet by writer Brian Michael Bendis and artist Alex Maleev, moved to Jinxworld in 2018
 The Book of Lost Souls by writer J. Michael Straczynski and artist Colleen Doran
 The Secret Service by writer Mark Millar and artist Dave Gibbons, moved to Image Comics in 2017
 Supercrooks by writer Mark Millar and artist Leinil Francis Yu
 Superior by writer Mark Millar and artist Leinil Francis Yu
 Takio by writer Brian Michael Bendis and artist Michael Avon Oeming
 The United States of Murder Inc. by writer Brian Michael Bendis and artist Michael Avon Oeming

See also
 Epic Comics, an earlier Marvel imprint for creator-owned works

Notes

External links

 Icon Comics Catalog

Publishers of adult comics
Marvel Comics imprints